The 2019 ACB Playoffs, also known as 2019 Liga Endesa Playoffs for sponsorship reasons, was the postseason tournament of the ACB's 2018–19 season, which began on 27 September 2018. The playoffs started on 30 May 2019 and ended on 21 June 2019 with the Finals.

Real Madrid defended successfully the title and conquered its second consecutive league, 35th overall.

Format
At the end of the regular season, the eight teams with the most wins qualify for the playoffs. The seedings are based on each team's record.

The bracket is fixed; there is no reseeding. The quarterfinals are best-of-three series; the team that wins two games advances to the next round. This round is in a 1–1–1 format. From the semifinals onward, the rounds are best-of-five series; the team that wins three games advances to the next round. These rounds, including the Finals, are in a 2–2–1 format. Home court advantage in any round belong to the higher-seeded team.

Playoff qualifying
On 31 March 2019, Barça Lassa became the first team to clinch a playoff spot.

Bracket
Teams in bold advance to the next round. The numbers to the left of each team indicate the team's seeding, and the numbers to the right indicate the result of games including result in bold of the team that won in that game.

Quarterfinals
All times are in Central European Summer Time (UTC+02:00)

Real Madrid v Baxi Manresa

This was the fourth playoff meeting between these two teams, with Real Madrid winning two of the first three meetings.

Barça Lassa v Divina Seguros Joventut

This was the 12th playoff meeting between these two teams, with Barça Lassa winning eight of the first 11 meetings.

Kirolbet Baskonia v Tecnyconta Zaragoza

This was the first meeting in the playoffs between Kirolbet Baskonia and Tecnyconta Zaragoza.

Valencia Basket v Unicaja

This was the sixth playoff meeting between these two teams, with Unicaja winning three of the first five meetings.

Semifinals
All times are in Central European Summer Time (UTC+02:00)

Real Madrid v Valencia Basket

This was the sixth playoff meeting between these two teams, with Real Madrid winning four of the first five meetings.

Barça Lassa v Tecnyconta Zaragoza

This was the first meeting in the playoffs between Barça Lassa and Tecnyconta Zaragoza.

Finals
All times are in Central European Summer Time (UTC+02:00)

This was the 19th playoff meeting between these two teams, with each team winning nine series.

References

External links
Playoffs official website
Playoffs news

2019
playoffs